Fortynine Palms Oasis is a three-mile, out and back trail located in Joshua Tree National Park in California, with a 300-foot elevation gain in both directions.

Information
The trail starts at Fortynine Palms Parking Area, goes up and over a ridge dotted with barrel cacti, and descends to a palm oasis in a rocky canyon. The palm trees were planted by miners in the early 1900s to easily locate the natural spring located there. The oasis is frequently used as a watering hole for bighorn sheep. In July 2018 a Canadian hiker, Paul Miller, went missing while on the trail. His remains were found off the trail in January 2020.

References

External links
Joshua Tree National Park Stargazing

Joshua Tree National Park